The Regiment "Cavalleggeri di Saluzzo" (12th) ( - "Chevau-légers of Saluzzo") is an inactive cavalry unit of the Italian Army.

History

Formation 
On 29 March 1848, one week after the people of Milan had driven the Imperial Austrian Army out of the city during the Five Days of Milan, the Provisional Government of Milan ordered to form two cavalry depots in Milan: one for a Dragoons regiment and one for a Chevau-légers regiment. Immediately the 1st Dragoons Squadron and the 1st Chevau-légers Squadron were formed and attached to the Lombard Division for the ongoing First Italian War of Independence. The depots proceeded to raise two regiments: the Regiment of Lombard Dragoons and the Regiment of Lombard Chevau-légers. Initially the two regiments assembled at Vigevano, but then moved to Venaria Reale near Turin, where on 5 September 1848 both regiments were integrated into the Royal Sardinian Army of the Kingdom of Sardinia. The two regimens then participated in the First Italian War of Independence and upon the war's conclusion were merged on 15 May 1849 as 7th Regiment of Cavalry. On 3 January 1850 the regiment was renamed Regiment "Cavalleggeri di Saluzzo".

The regiment's 1st Squadron was part of the Sardinian expeditionary corps' Provisional Light Cavalry Regiment, which fought in the Crimean War and distinguished itself on 16 August 1855 in the Battle of the Chernaya.

Italian Wars of Independence 
During the Second Italian War of Independence the regiment fought at San Martino. In 1862-63 the regiment operated in the Vulture and Murge area to suppress the anti-Sardinian revolt in Southern Italy after the Kingdom of Sardinia had invaded and annexed the Kingdom of Two Sicilies.

In 1866 the regiment participated in the Third Italian War of Independence and fought in the Battle of Custoza. Over the next years the regiment repeatedly changed its name:

 10 September 1871: 12th Regiment of Cavalry (Saluzzo)
 5 November 1876: Cavalry Regiment "Saluzzo" (12th)
 16 December 1897: Regiment "Cavalleggeri di Saluzzo" (12th)

In 1887 the regiment contributed to the formation of the Mounted Hunters Squadron, which fought in the Italo-Ethiopian War of 1887–1889. In 1895-96 the regiment provided 67 enlisted personnel for units deployed to Italian Eritrea for the First Italo-Ethiopian War. In 1911-12 the regiment provided five officers and 81 enlisted to augment units fighting in the Italo-Turkish War. Between the Second Italian War of Independence and World War I the Saluzzo ceded on six occasions one of its squadrons to help form new Chevau-légers regiments:

 16 September 1859: Regiment "Cavalleggeri di Lodi" (15th)
 16 February 1864: Regiment "Cavalleggeri di Caserta (17th)
 1 January 1872: Regiment "Cavalleggeri di Roma" (20th)
 1 October 1883: Regiment "Cavalleggeri di Catania" (22nd)
 1 November 1887: Regiment "Cavalleggeri di Umberto I" (23rd)
 1 October 1909: Regiment "Cavalleggeri di Treviso" (28th)

World War I 
At the outbreak of World War I the regiment consisted of a command, the regimental depot, and two cavalry groups, with the I Group consisting of three squadrons and the II Group consisting of two squadrons and a machine gun section. Together with the Regiment "Cavalleggeri di Vicenza" (24th) the Saluzzo formed the V Cavalry Brigade of the 3rd Cavalry Division of "Lombardia". The division fought dismounted in the trenches of the Italian Front, where the regiment distinguished itself at the Battle of Istrago, for which it was awarded a Silver Medal of Military Valour. In 1917 the regimental depot in Milan formed the 852nd Dismounted Machine Gunners Company as reinforcement for infantry units on the front.

Interwar years 
After the war the Italian Army disbanded 14 of its 30 cavalry regiments and so on 21 November 1919 the II Group of the Saluzzo was renamed "Cavalleggeri di Vicenza" as it consisted of personnel and horses from the disbanded Regiment "Cavalleggeri di Vicenza" (24th). In 1920 the Saluzzo moved from Milan to Bologna, where it took over the barracks of the disbanded Regiment "Lancieri di Mantova" (25th). On 20 May 1920 the Saluzzo received and integrated a squadron from the Regiment "Cavalleggeri Guide" (19th), which before had been one of the squadrons of the Regiment "Cavalleggeri di Foggia" (11th). On the same date the Saluzzo also received the traditions of the disbanded Regiment "Cavalleggeri di Foggia" (11th).

In 1927 the regiment moved from Bologna to Pordenone. In 1935-36 the Saluzzo contributed seven officers and 450 enlisted for units, which were deployed to East Africa for the Second Italo-Ethiopian War.

World War II 

At the outbreak of World War II the regiment consisted of a command, a command squadron, the I and II squadrons groups, each with two mounted squadrons, and the 5th Machine Gunners Squadron. The regiment was part of the 1st Cavalry Division "Eugenio di Savoia" and served in occupied Yugoslavia on anti-partisan duty.

During the war the regiment's depot in Pordenone formed the:
 XVII Dismounted Group "Cavalleggeri di Saluzzo"
 LVIII Dismounted Group "Cavalleggeri di Saluzzo"

After the announcement of the Armistice of Cassibile on 8 September 1943 the regiment was disbanded by invading German forces near Florence.

Cold War 

On 15 September 1964 the Italian Army disbanded the Regiment "Lancieri di Aosta" (6th) in Reggio Emilia and the next day the regiment's II Squadrons Group in Reggio Emilia received the name Squadrons Group "Cavalleggeri di Saluzzo". In 1965 the group moved from Reggio Emilia to Gradisca d'Isonzo in Friuli Venezia Giulia, where it joined the Infantry Division "Folgore" as divisional reconnaissance unit. In 1975 the squadrons group moved from Gradisca d'Isonzo to Gorizia.

During the 1975 army reform the army disbanded the regimental level and newly independent battalions were granted for the first time their own flags. On 1 January 1976 the squadrons group was renamed 12th Reconnaissance Squadrons Group "Cavalleggeri di Saluzzo" and assigned the flag and traditions of the Regiment "Cavalleggeri di Saluzzo" (12th). The squadrons group consisted of a command, a command and services squadron, and three reconnaissance squadrons equipped with Fiat Campagnola reconnaissance vehicles, M113 armored personnel carriers, and M47 Patton tanks. The Saluzzo continued to be the Mechanized Division "Folgore"'s reconnaissance unit. In 1980 the Saluzzo began to replace its M47 Patton tanks with Leopard 1A2 main battle tanks.

In 1986 the Italian Army disbanded the divisional level and placed brigades under direct command of its Army Corps. With the Folgore scheduled to disband the 12th Reconnaissance Squadrons Group "Cavalleggeri di Saluzzo" was reorganized and renamed on 31 July 1986 as 12th Mechanized Squadrons Group "Cavalleggeri di Saluzzo". The squadrons group joined the Mechanized Brigade "Vittorio Veneto" and consisted now of a command, a command and services squadron, three mechanized squadrons with M113 armored personnel carriers, and a heavy mortar squadron with M106 mortar carriers with 120mm mod. 63 mortars.

After the end of the Cold War the Italian Army began to draw down its forces and the Vittorio Veneto was one of the first brigades to disband. On 31 January 1991 the "Cavalleggeri di Saluzzo" was disbanded and its flag transferred on 20 February 1991 to the Shrine of the Flags in the Vittoriano in Rome.

See also 
 Armored Brigade "Vittorio Veneto"

References

Cavalry Regiments of Italy